Smorgon Steel was an Australian steel manufacturing company. It was the last remaining part of Smorgon Consolidated Industries, founded in 1958 by Victor Smorgon, member of the Smorgon family.

In 1997, Smorgon purchased structural materials Welded Mesh from Leighton Holdings. In December 1998, Smorgon Steel took over Australian National Industries. It was floated on the Australian Securities Exchange in February 1999.

In December 2001, Bradken was sold to Castle Harlan Australian Mezzanine Partners. In 2007 Smorgon Steel merged with OneSteel, with its distribution operations sold to BlueScope.

References

Companies based in Melbourne
Companies formerly listed on the Australian Securities Exchange
Defunct manufacturing companies of Australia
Manufacturing companies established in 1958
Manufacturing companies disestablished in 2007
1958 establishments in Australia
2007 disestablishments in Australia